The Stayner Siskins are a Canadian Junior ice hockey team based in Stayner, Ontario.  They were members of the Georgian Mid-Ontario Junior C Hockey League until 2016 when it merged into the Provincial Junior Hockey League.

History
The Stayner Siskins began their journey in 1972 as a member of the South-Central Junior D Hockey League.  The next year, the league was promoted and became the Central Ontario Junior C Hockey League.  In these early years, the Siskins were not overly successful in their league, but during the playoff were sent out to represent the league in the All-Ontario Junior "D" playdowns for the Ontario Hockey Association Cup.

The Siskins first appearance in the All-Ontario Junior D championship came during the 1973-74 season.  This year saw the beginning of a three-year rivalry with the Belmont Bombers of the Western Ontario Junior D Hockey League.  In the 1974 final, the Siskins, led by veteran captain Kevin McInnis, dropped the Bombers 4-games-to-2 to win their first OHA Cup.

The next year saw the Siskins make their second appearance.  Again the Belmont Bombers were in town, but they were ready this time.  The Bombers dispatched the Stayner Siskins 4-games-to-1.

In 1975-76, the Stayner Siskins and Belmont Bombers met for the third and final time.  The Siskins and Bombers both came out to win, as the series went the distance the Siskins took the decisive game 7 and the series 4-games-to-3.  It is doubtful that these two franchises have ever met since outside of tournament or exhibition play.

In 1976, the Central Ontario Junior C Hockey League became the Mid-Ontario Junior C Hockey League.  The 1976-77 playoffs saw Stayner reach the Ontario Hockey Association Cup final again, but this time against the Western league's Exeter Hawks.  The Hawks proved too much for the Siskins to handle as they swept Stayner 4-games-to-none.

In 1992, the Stayner Siskins won the Mid-Ontario Junior C Hockey League championship.  They entered the All-Ontario playdowns and made it all the way to the Clarence Schmalz Cup final but lost to the Great Lakes Junior C Hockey League's powerhouse Belle River Canadiens.  The Siskins won the last Mid-Ontario league championship in 1994, but did not advance to the All-Ontario final.

In 1994, the Mid-Ontario league merged with Georgian Bay Junior C Hockey League to create the Georgian Mid-Ontario Junior C Hockey League.  It took Stayner until the 2001-02 to win the title of this new league and they won it again in 2003-04.  They were not able to reach the Clarence Schmalz Cup on either campaign.

The 2005-06 season saw the Siskins finish sixth place at the end of the regular season.  The Siskins drew the third seeded Alliston Hornets.  The Siskins played spoiler in a huge way.  The Hornets were heavily favoured to win the series and had built up a 3-games-to-none lead.  Out of nowhere, the Siskins won games 4, 5, 6, and finally game 7 to pull the ultimate upset and advance to the league semi-finals.  The Siskins fell to the eventual provincial champions, the Penetang Kings managed to defeat them 4-games-to-1.

The 2006-07 season had the Siskins finish fifth place in the league and draw the fourth seeded Erin Shamrocks in the league quarter-finals.  The Siskins upset the Shamrocks and won the series 4-games-to-2.  They then ran into the first seeded Fergus Devils and fell to the Devils 4-games-to-1.

Season-by-season standings

Clarence Schmalz Cup appearances
1992: Belle River Canadiens defeated Stayner Siskins 4-games-to-2

Championship Playoffs 2022 
Clarence Schmalz Cup Championships

Notable alumni
Jason Arnott
Steve Walker

External links
Stayner Siskins OHA Webpage

Georgian Mid-Ontario Junior C Hockey League teams